The 2021–22 season of the Belgian First Division B began in August 2021 and ended in April 2022, with Westerlo winning the title by a considerable margin over RWDM, the latter losing the promotion play-off and hence not promoted together with Westerlo. Virton ended in last place and would have been relegated, were it not for the fact that after the season Excel Mouscron was not awarded a licence, causing them to be relegated instead.

Team changes

In
 Royal Excel Mouscron were directly relegated from the 2020–21 Belgian First Division A after finishing last.
 Waasland-Beveren were also relegated from the 2020–21 Belgian First Division A, after losing the promotion/relegation play-offs against Seraing.
 Virton, who were denied both a professional and remunerated license at the end of the 2019–20 season and forced to relegate two levels as a result, successfully appealed this decision and were forced to be reinstated at this level.

Out
 Union SG were promoted from the 2020–21 Belgian First Division B as champions.
 Seraing were promoted to the 2021–22 Belgian First Division A after winning the promotion/relegation play-offs against Waasland-Beveren.
 Club NXT was removed as it was decided no longer to include U23 teams for the 2021–22 season.

Format changes
Initially, the plan was to change the format of the Belgian First Division B only for the 2020–21 season, with the league no longer consisting of two separate competitions but instead, one single league in which all teams play each other four times, without playoffs. This was however extended with at least one season, meaning the 2021–22 Belgian First Division B continues with the same format as the previous season.

Team information

Stadiums and locations

Personnel and kits

Managerial changes

League table

Positions by round 
The table lists the positions of teams after the completion of each round. In the overview below, not all teams had played the same number of matches:
 The match between RWDM and Westerlo on matchday 15 was postponed and instead played between matchdays 17 and 18.
 The match between Westerlo and Deinze on matchday 17 was postponed and instead played between matchdays 19 and 20.
 The match between Lierse and Westerlo on matchday 21 was postponed and instead played between matchdays 24 and 25.

Season statistics

Top scorers

Team of the season
Upon completion of the regular season a team of the season award was compiled, based upon the results of the team of the week results throughout the season, constructed based on nominations from managers, assistant-managers, journalists and analysts. The results were announced from 25 April 2022, with one player revealed each day.

Number of teams by provinces

Notes

References

2021-22
2021–22 in European second tier association football leagues
2